TouchDesigner is a node based visual programming language for real time interactive multimedia content, developed by the Toronto-based company Derivative. It's been used by artists, programmers, creative coders, software designers, and performers to create performances, installations, and fixed media works.

History
Greg Hermanovic, Rob Bairos, and Jarrett Smith founded the Canadian company Derivative. In 2000 Hermanovic used the Houdini 4.1 code base as the initial scaffolding for the TouchDesigner. From 2002 to 2007 TouchDesigner's release title adopted the trailing 007 to 017 digits to indicate its versioning. Finally in 2008 Derivative released a beta version of the platform as TouchDesigner 077, a rewrite of its previous versions that incorporates a fully procedural OpenGL compositing and effects pipeline.

Features
TouchDesigner covers several major areas of 2D and 3D production, including:
 Rendering and compositing
 Workflow and scalable architecture
 Video and audio in and out
 Multi-display support
Video mapping
 Animation and control channels
 Custom control panels and application building
 3D engine and tools
 Device and software interoperability
 Scripting and programming

Operators
Operators are the building blocks in a TouchDesigner project. These objects are represented as Nodes in the user interface and are connected in order to create procedural effects and animation. Each operator is customized with a unique set of parameters and flags that control its operation and processing. Operators, often referred to as ops, come in six varieties:
 COMP  Components represent 3D objects, panel components, and other various operators. These components can house entire networks of other operators. 
 TOP  Texture operators handle all 2D image operations.
 CHOP  Channel operators are used for motion, audio, animation, and control signals.
 SOP  Surface operators are the native 3D objects of TouchDesigner responsible for 3D points, polygons, and other 3D "primitives"
 MAT  Materials are used for applying materials and shaders to the 3D rendering pipeline.
 DAT  Data operators are for ASCII text as plain text, scripts, XML, and tables.

COMP 
Component operators differ from other operators in the TouchDesigner family as they are capable of holding networks of other operators. These components encompass both 3D objects and interactive panel elements used when designing interfaces in TouchDesigner. Components also support the use of in and out connections, allowing them to act as modular components across projects.

TOP 
Texture operators are image-based operations that are GPU accelerated. Data in TOPs can be scaled to any resolution, limited only by the amount of RAM available on a system's graphics card.

CHOP 
Channel operators are the backbone of the control system in TouchDesigner. Used for processing motion data, audio, on-screen controls, MIDI data, and other input devices, these operators organize data as a series of channels. According to the derivative wiki entry about CHOPs, they "were designed to reduce the tedium of motion editing and to help build and manage more complex motion."

SOP 
Surface operators are objects responsible for 3D operations and modeling in TouchDesigner. These objects are used to generate, import, modify, and combine 3D surfaces. Supported surface types are polygons, curves, NURBS surfaces, metaballs, and particles. This is perhaps the oldest part of TouchDesigner and has its roots directly in the Houdini 4.1 code base.

MAT 
Materials are used as a part of the 3D rendering pipeline in TouchDesigner. Several standard material types exist, as well as materials that support importing custom vertex and pixel shaders.

DAT 
Data operators are used to hold text, tables, text-encoded data (XML, JSON), and scripts. These operators are also sometimes used to store readme documents and other code comments in a given network.

Notes

Visual programming languages